Bischofstein Castle may refer to:

 Bischofstein Castle (Germany), a castle on the Moselle river in Germany
 Bischofstein Castle (Switzerland), a castle in the Swiss canton of Basel-Land